Thuggee are actions and crimes carried out by Thugs, historically, organised gangs of professional robbers and murderers in India. The English word thug traces its roots to the Hindi ठग, which means 'swindler' or 'deceiver'. Related words are the verb thugna ('to deceive'), from the Sanskrit स्थग ( 'cunning, sly, fraudulent') and स्थगति ('he conceals'). This term, describing the murder and robbery of travellers, was popular in the northern parts of the Indian subcontinent, especially northern and eastern regions of historical India (present-day northern/eastern India and Bangladesh). Contemporary scholarship is increasingly skeptical of the thuggee concept, and has questioned the existence of such a phenomenon, which has led many historians to describe thuggee as the invention of the British colonial regime.

Thugs were said to have travelled in groups across the Indian subcontinent. Thugs are said to have operated as gangs of highway robbers, tricking and later strangling their victims. To take advantage of their victims, the thugs would join travellers and gain their confidence, which would allow them to surprise and strangle the travellers with a handkerchief or noose. They would then rob and bury their victims. This led to the thugs being called Phansigar ("using a noose"), a term more commonly used in southern India. During the 1830s, the thugs were targeted for eradication by the Governor-General of India, Lord William Bentinck, and his chief captain, William Henry Sleeman.

Modus operandi 

The Thuggee units would assume the physical appearance of travellers. Initially they wore turbans and carried with them a certain amount of baggage. Their attire as travellers would deceive peasants and royalty alike.

The methods used by the Thugs were meant to reap maximum loot without being caught. They did not accost travellers unless their own numbers were greater than those of their victims. They flattered travellers they met, which gave them a chance to assess what wealth their targets might have. Many of them avoided committing thuggee near the areas in which they lived, making the discovery of their crimes a difficult task. They often pretended to be either Hindu or Muslim to fool their victims.

They usually attacked in the evening. A common method used was to distract their victims by engaging them in conversation, so that others in the band could strangle them swiftly from behind. To avoid suspicion, they avoided carrying more than a few swords. Sometimes they mutilated the corpses of their victims to avoid detection. The corpses were then hidden or buried.

A leader of a gang was called jemadar. Usage of military-style ranks such as jemadar and subedar among Thugs as well as reference to individual members as a "private", suggests that the organisation of their gangs had a military link. They used a jargon known as Ramasee to disguise their true intentions from their targets. Although strangulation is one of their most-recognised methods of murder, they also used blades and poison.

The thugs comprised both men who had inherited thuggee as a family vocation, as well as those who were forced to turn to it out of necessity. The leadership of many of the groups tended to be hereditary with family members sometimes serving together in the same band. Such Thugs were known as aseel. Many Thugs insisted, however, that novices were not taught Thuggee by their family but by others who were often more experienced Thugs, sometimes also called a guru. While they usually kept their acts a secret, female thugs also existed and were called baronee in Ramasee, while an important male Thug was called baroo.

They would often avoid killing children of victims and instead adopted them. They sometimes tended to murder women and children to eliminate witnesses or in case they had substantial loot. Some of the thugs avoided murdering victims they considered proscribed according to their beliefs and let other unscrupulous members commit the murder or were forced to let them by those who did not believe in their customs like the Muslim thugs.

History
The earliest known reference to the Thugs as a band or fraternity, rather than ordinary thieves, is found in Ziau-d din Barni's History of Firoz Shah (written about 1356). He narrated an incident of the sultan Jalal-ud-din Khalji having 1,000 arrested thugs being sent to Lakhnauti or Gaur:

There were numerous traditions about their origin; however, nothing is concrete. One recorded by D. F. McLeod traced it to some Muslim tribes formed from those who fled Delhi after murdering a physician. Another traced it to some great Muslim families who fled after murdering a favored slave of Akbar. According to this view, the original Muslim Thugs spread Thuggee amongst Hindus. According to other traditions preserved by the Thugs themselves, they were Kanjars or descended from those who worked in the Mughal camps. Others have blamed the rise of Thugs on the disbanding of armies in employment of Indian rulers after the British conquest.

In the 16th century Surdas, in his allegorical couplet, mentioned robbers called "thags" who would lure victims into their clutches to kill them and steal their property. Ibn Battuta, on his way to Calicut from Delhi as an envoy to China, was attacked by bandits, who probably were thugs.  The Janamsakhis used the term thag to refer to a robber who used to lure pilgrims. Jean de Thévenot in his 1665 account referred to a band of robbers who used a "certain Slip with a running noose" to strangle their victims. John Fryer also mentions a similar method of strangling used by robbers from Surat whom he saw being given capital punishment by the Mughals in 1675. He mentioned that three of them were relatives, which Kim Wagner notices is similar to the Thugs who were thought to have engaged in this as a family profession. A decree issued by Aurangzeb in 1672 refers to a similar method and uses the term "Phansigar".
 

The garrote is often depicted as a weapon of the Thuggee. Other evidences suggest that the Katar (dagger) was their personal status weapon, the Thuggee wore this weapon proudly across their chest. Early references to Thugs reported they committed their strangulation murders with nooses of rope or catgut, but later they adopted the use of a length of cloth that could be used as a sash or scarf, and thus more easily concealed. This cloth is sometimes described as a rumāl (head covering or kerchief), translated as "yellow scarf"; "yellow", in this case, may refer to a natural cream or khaki colour rather than bright yellow.

The Thug preference for strangulation accorded the thugs some protection under the law which persisted from the times of the Mughal Empire, which ruled most of India from the 1500s. For a murderer to be sentenced to death, he or she must have shed the blood of their victim. Those who murdered but did not shed blood might face imprisonment, hard labor and paying a penalty—but they would not risk execution.

Preparations of  Datura metel, the Indian thornapple, (family Solanaceae), a poisonous plant sacred to Shiva with powerful deliriant properties, were sometimes used by Thugs to induce drowsiness or stupefaction, making strangulation easier.
The Hindi name for the plant धतूरा (dhatūra) is derived from the Sanskrit and was adapted by Linnaeus into the Latinate genus name Datura.

The "River Thugs" preyed upon people including Hindu pilgrims travelling using the Ganga river and became mostly active during the winter like their compatriots from Murnae, Bundelkhand and Awadh. Their dialect of Ramasee differed from the one used by their compatriots on land and used boats taken on lease from their builders or from a jemadar called Khuruck Baboo. Sleeman states that they tapped three times to give the signal to murder which they always committed during the day. To avoid detection of a corpse, they broke its back and threw it in the river to be eaten by crocodiles and only looted money or jewels.

British suppression

The British found out about them in Southern India for the first time in 1807, while in North India they were discovered in 1809 with an effort to suppress them being carried out from 1809 to 1812.

After a dispute developed between the zamindar Tejun and the Thug Ghasee Ram in 1812, the latter took refuge with his family under another landlord called Laljee. Tejun in turn revealed the thugs of Sindouse to Nathaniel Halhed. Thomas Perry, the magistrate of Etawah, assembled some soldiers of the East India Company under the command of Halheld in 1812 to suppress the Thugs. Laljee and his forces including over 100 Thugs were defeated, with the village of Murnae, a headquarter of the Thugs, destroyed and burnt by the Company soldiers. Laljee fled to Rampura and the southern banks of Sindh River but was caught by the Marathas who turned him over to the company.

British authorities had occasionally captured and prosecuted Thugs, circulating information about these cases in newsletters or the journal Asiatick Researches of The Asiatic Society. However, Sleeman seems to have been the first to realize that information obtained from one group of stranglers might be used to track and identify other thugs in a different district. His first major breakthrough was the capture of "Feringhea" (also known as Syeed Amir Ali, Khuda Buksh, Deahuct Undun and Daviga Persaud), who was persuaded to turn King's evidence. (Feringhea's story was the basis of the successful 1839 novel Confessions of a Thug). Feringhea brought Sleeman to a mass grave with a hundred bodies, told him the circumstances of the murders and named the Thugs who had committed them.

After initial investigations confirmed what Feringhea had said, Sleeman began an extensive campaign using profiling and intelligence. Sleeman was made superintendent of the Thuggee and Dacoity Department in 1835, an organ of the Indian government first established by the East India Company in 1830. (Dacoity was a type of organised banditry, distinguished from Thugs most notably by its open practice and due to the fact that murder was not an intrinsic element of their modus operandi.) Sleeman developed elaborate intelligence techniques that pre-dated similar methods in Europe and the US by decades.

Records were made in which the accused were given prisoner numbers, against which their names, residences, fellow thugs, and the criminal acts for which they were blamed were also noted. Many thugs' names were similar; they often lacked surnames since the Thuggee naming convention was to use the names of their tribes, castes and job assignments in the gangs. Accurate recording was also difficult because the thugs adopted many aliases, with both Muslim and Hindu thugs often posing as members of the other religion. Per the Thug Ghulam Hussain, though Hindus and Muslims avoided eating together, such was not the case for drinking and smoking.

The campaign relied heavily on captured Thugs who became informants. These informants were offered protection on the condition that they told everything that they knew. According to historian Mike Dash, who used documents in the UK archives, suspects were subject to bench trials before English judges. Though the trials were lacking by later standards (e.g., suspects were not allowed legal representation), they were conducted with care to protocols of the time. While most suspects were convicted, Dash notes that the courts genuinely seemed interested in finding the truth and rejected a minority of allegations due to mistaken identity or insufficient evidence. Even by later standards, Dash argues, the evidence of guilt for many Thugs was often overwhelming.

Because they used boats and disposed of their victims in rivers, the "River Thugs" were able to evade the British authorities for some time after their compatriots on land were suppressed. They were ultimately betrayed to the authorities by one of their compatriots, from Awadh. Forces under Sleeman's command hunted them down in 1836.

Aftermath
By the 1870s the Thug cult was essentially extinct, but the history of Thuggee led to the Criminal Tribes Act (CTA) of 1871. Although the CTA was repealed at Indian independence in 1947, tribes considered criminal still exist in India. The Thuggee and Dacoity Department remained in existence until 1904, when it was replaced by the Central Criminal Intelligence Department (CID).

In Following the Equator, Mark Twain wrote about an 1839 government report by William Henry Sleeman:

Thug view

Thugs considered themselves to be the children of Kali, having been created from her sweat. However, many of the Thugs who were captured and convicted by the British were Muslims, perhaps up to a third.

According to colonial sources, Thugs believed that they played a positive role in saving human lives. Without the Thugs' sacred service, Kali might destroy all mankind:
 "It is God who kills, but Bhowanee has [a] name for it."
 "God is all in all, for good and evil."
 "God has appointed blood for [Bhowanee's] food, saying 'khoon tum khao': feed thou upon blood. In my opinion it is very bad, but what can she do, being ordered to subsist upon blood!"
 "Bhowanee is happy and more so in proportion to the blood that is shed."

The Muslim thugs, while retaining their monotheistic faith, had functionalised Bhavani for Thuggee and she was syncretised as a spirit subordinate to Allah. A Muslim thug caught by Sleeman stated "In my heart, I take the name of God, when I strangle a man – saying "thou God and ruler!" "Alla, toomee Malik!" I do not pray to Bhowanee, but I worship her." Other Muslim thugs who had agreed to testify for Sleeman, stated they had assimilated Bhavani and started the practice of thuggee.

According to historian Mike Dash, the Thugs had no religious motive to kill. When religious elements were present among Thugs, their beliefs, in principle, were little different from the religious beliefs of many others who lived on the Indian subcontinent and attributed their success or failure to supernatural powers: "Indeed all of the Thugs's legends which concerned the goddess Kali featured exactly the cautionary notes which are typically found in folklore."

Donald Friell McLeod who led the campaign against them in the Rajputana Agency, recorded the traditions of their origins. According to them, they were originally Muslims and were taught Thuggee by the deity Devi or Bhavani. They then joined the Lodha people and migrated to Delhi where 84 tribes which were a part of all the criminal clans of India also became a part of the Thugs. A physician who belonged to these 84 tribes gained prominence after curing a royal elephant and was murdered by other Thugs. A schism developed and they left Delhi, which in turn led to the origin of seven Muslim tribes. According to McLeod, these tribes were named Bhyns, Bursot, Kachinee, Hutar, Kathur Gugra, Behleem and Ganoo. According to him, the thugs from Delhi were separated into more than 12 "classes".

The earliest recorded traditions about the origins of the Thugs date back to 1760. Based on genealogies which were recounted by some Thugs, historian Mike Dash stated that the origin of the Thuggee can be dated back to the second half of the 17th century. A general consensus among them was that they originated in Delhi. The thug Gholam Hossyn who was caught in early 1800s stated that his accomplices believed that Thugs had existed since the time of Alexander the Great. Another tradition among Thugs who lived in the early 1800s stated that they had lived in Delhi till the time of Akbar and consisted of seven great Muslim clans, though they had Hindu names, during the period. After one of them killed a favoured slave of Akbar, they left Delhi for other regions to avoid being targeted by the emperor. A Brahmin thug who was interrogated by Sleeman referred to the Muslim thugs as  Kanjars though another Thug denied this.

Kim Wagner asserts that we can analyse their traditions about events after their flight from Delhi "to a much greater advantage". A tradition which was recounted by a captive Thug stated that the Thugs had originally tried to settle in Agra and they later settled in Akoopore in the Doab region. However, they had to flee to Himmutpur and later they fled to Parihara after their kings started demanding a larger share of the loot. In turn the original Muslim and Kayasth Thugs helped spread Thuggee amongst other groups like the Brahmins, Rajputs, Hindus, the Lodhi people and the Ahir people.

One thug stated that some of the ancestors of the Thugs were forced to disguise themselves as Khunjurs while they were fleeing Delhi but they were high-caste Muslims. He, however, stated that their claimed descent may be wrong and some of them may be partially descended from poor people who worked in the Mughal army's camps. However, their claim that membership in the Thugs' clans was closed to outsiders is contradicted by the fact that people of all backgrounds were allowed to join them by the early 19th century according to available evidence.

They considered it sinful to kill women, fakirs, bards, musicians and dancers. Like the ancient Hindu texts which distinguished robbery from the murder of Brahmins, women or children as violent crimes, many Thugs considered it taboo to kill people who belonged to such categories. Those who worked in lowly professions, the diseased and disabled were also forbidden as victims based on their folk belief. The thugs who broke these rules of the fraternity were often believed to have been targeted by divine punishment and their manner of death was thought to depend upon the rules they broke.

Sects

The East India Company officers since the time of Thomas Perry, who was appointed to Etawah in 1811, came to understand that there were many Thug groups and they all viewed themselves to be different from the other groups.

The Thug sects were mostly identified based on their habitat, but also based on their professions. The sect called Jamuldahee was named so because its members lived along the Yamuna river, they hailed from the Doab and Awadh regions. Another stated origin is that their ancestor was the Thug Jumulud Deen. The Telinganie originated from Telangana, Arcottees from Arcot and Beraries from Berar. The Lodaha sect, mostly concentrated in Bihar, were caravaneers named after the lodha or load they carried and according to a Thug from the Doab, originated from the same ancestors of his clan. The Lodahas were prevalent in the region around Nepal in Bihar and Bengal during the tenure of Perry and originally hailed from Awadh which they left around 1700. A Deccan Thug stated that the "Hindu Thugs of Talghat", located around the Krishna River, didn't marry with the Telinganies whom they considered to be descendants of lower classes as a result of their professions. The Telinganie sect were also disparagingly called Handeewuls (from handi) due to their eating habits.

The Pungoo or Bungoo of Bengal derived their name from the region, with the Lodhees or Lodaha also present. The Motheea sect of Rampur-Purnia region was from a caste of weavers and their name derived from the practice of giving "handful" (muhti) of the spoils to the head. In the Uttar Pradesh the sects were: the Korkureeas from Kohrur, Agureeas of Agra, Jumaldahees, Lodhees and Tundals. The Multaneea were from Multan. In Madhya Pradesh the sects were: Bangureeas or Banjaras, Balheems or Bulheems, Khokhureeas and Soopurreeas of Sheopur. In modern Rajasthan, the sects were Guguras whose name derives from river Ghaggar and Sooseeas who were part of the Dhanuk clan. The Dhoulanee sect existed in modern-day Maharashtra. The Duckunies of Deccan were from Munirabad and Kurnaketies from Carnatic region. Another sect was Kathurs whose name derives from a bowl called kathota, based on a tradition of a man who held it during celebrations by Thugs. The Qulundera sect's name was derived from the Muslim saints called qalandar. There were also Jogee thugs who were divided into twelve sub-groups.

According to Feringheea, the Brahmins of Tehngoor village of Parihar were taught the Thuggee after they accompanied the kings of Meos to Delhi and later helped in spreading it in the region around Murnae. He also states that two of his ancestors who had settled and intermarried with Brahmins of Murnae about seven generations ago, which led to the introduction of Thuggee in the area. A Thug hailing from Shikohabad whilst talking of his clan's origin recounted to Perry a tradition that the Munhars were influenced to take up Thuggee after witnessing the immense plunder acquired by Afghans, Mewatties and the Sheikhs.

Sleeman in 1839 identified a band called "Meypunnaists" who he stated abducted children to sell them further. Another band called "Tashmabazes" who used methods introduced by a soldier named Creagh who was deployed at Cawnpore in 1802 were also identified by him. The group called "River Thugs" were based deep in the South Bengal region.

Colonial British view

The British generally took the view that Thuggee was a type of ritual murder practiced by worshippers of the goddess Kali. Sleeman's view of it as an aberrant faith was based on the contemporary British view that Hinduism was a despicable and immoral faith founded on idol-worship. R. C. Sherwood in Asiatick Resarches published in 1820 traces this phenomenon back to the Muslim conquests of India and suggests links to Hindu mythology. Charles Trevelyan however instead of seeing them as a deviant sect, considered them to be representatives of the "essence" of Hinduism which he considered as "evil" and "false". Sleeman considered some Brahmins acted as intelligence providers to Thugs, claiming that they profited from Thuggee and directed it.

Kali's worship by thugs, both Muslims and Hindus, was emphasised by the British. McLeod commented, "It is a notable fact that not only amongst the Thugs, but in an especial manner among all lawless fraternities, and to a certain extent throughout the uneducated population of Central India, the Mussulmans vie with the Hindus in a devotion of this sanguinary deity (Devi or Bhavani) far exceeding that they pay to any other." David Ochterlony blamed the Pindaris for the rise of Thuggee while Sleeman blamed it on Indian rulers dismissing their armies which took away the jobs of many soldiers. Based on Sleeman's writings about the Thugs, Robert Vane Russell claimed that most of them were Kanjars. He viewed the Muslim Kanjars as having recently converted to Islam.

In 1882 Alexander Cunningham commented on Hiouen-Thsang's remarks about "people who visited Kahalgaon and forgot to leave it", speculating that the actual reason might not have been that posited by the monk and noting Kahalgaon's later reputation as a place frequented by the "River Thugs".

Dispute and scepticism

Contemporary scholars have become increasingly sceptical of the "thuggee" concept, and have even questioned the existence of such a phenomenon. The British representation of Thuggee is held by some critics to be full of inconsistencies and exaggerations. Numerous historians have described "thuggee" as basically the invention of the British colonial regime. However, the more radical critics in this camp have themselves been criticized for focusing overly on British perceptions of thuggee rather than on the historical accuracy of primary source documents, but conclude that "the colonial representation of thuggee cannot be taken at face value".

Martine van Woerkens of École Pratique des Hautes Études writes that evidence for a Thug cult in the 19th century was the product of "colonial imaginings", arising from British fear of the little-known interior of India, as well as limited understanding of the religious and social practices of its inhabitants.

Cynthia Ann Humes states that the testimony of most of the thugs captured by Sleeman does not support his view of priests profiting from and directing the Thugs. She adds that the Islamic idea of fate or Iqbal was more commonly invoked during Thuggee acts, while invoking the Hindu Bhavani was far more rare.

Historian Kim Wagner views the policies of East India Company in relation to the dismissal of armies of the conquered Indian kingdoms as being responsible for the development of Thuggee. Roaming bands of freelance soldiers had often joined one kingdom or another during the pre-British era, with the main income of many armies coming from plunder. After being dismissed from military service, they turned to robbery as a means of subsistence. He also contested whether the thugs mentioned by Firuz Shah Tughlaq's biography were actually the same Thugs the British authorities fought against.

Sagnik Bhattacharya agrees with the sceptics and claims the thug-phenomenon to be nothing but a manifestation of the fear of the unknown that dawned on the British Raj at the thought of being alone in the wilderness of Central India. Using literary and legal sources, he has connected the "information panic" of the thug-phenomenon to the limitations of British demographic models that fell short of truly capturing the ethnic diversity of India. He explains the thug panic of the 1830s as being caused by the Raj's angst at realizing its own ignorance of local society.

In popular culture
One of the c. 1600 Janamsakhis fictionalizing the life of Sikh Guru Nanak describes an encounter with a Thug, Sheikh Sajjan, whom the guru reforms.
The 1826 novel Pandurang Hari, or Memoirs of a Hindoo by William Browne Hockley provides in Chapter 11 the earliest British fictional account of the Thugs. But they are depicted only as thieves, not as murderers.
The 1839 novel Confessions of a Thug by Philip Meadows Taylor is based on the Thuggee cult, revolving around a fictional Thug who is named Ameer Ali. The novel popularized the word "thug" in the English language.
 Several of Emilio Salgari's Sandokan novels describe a struggle with the Thugs.  Many of his novels are about Sandokan's adventures, and feature the Thug as enemies of the heroes.  The first of them – I misteri della jungla nera (1887) – was originally published with the title Gli strangolatori del Gange ("The stranglers of the Ganges"). His novel I misteri della giungla nera (1895) revolves around the main character Tremal Naik's fight to save Ada Corisant, the daughter of a British officer, who has been kidnapped by the Thugs.
 The 1886 novel Kalee's Shrine by Grant Allen and May Cotes features a British female Thug. 
 Sir Arthur Conan Doyle introduces the Thugs in his 1887 short story "Uncle Jeremy's Household". Miss Warrender, the Anglo-Indian governess in this story, is the daughter of the fictional Thug prince Achmet Genghis Khan.
The 1931 crime novel The Case of the Frightened Lady by Edgar Wallace makes an indirect reference to the Thuggee murders by featuring "Indian scarves" which are used as murder weapons, as do its 1940 and 1963 West German film adaptations.
The 1939 film Gunga Din features British soldiers' conflict with a resurgent sect of Thuggee cultists.
The Thuggees and their method of killing are made reference to in the 1945 film Hangover Square.
The Stranglers of Bombay (1959) is a film which is centered around a lone British officer who investigates and uncovers the doings of the Thuggee cult.
Kali Yug, la dea della vendetta and Il mistero del tempio indiano, films by Mario Camerini (1963), features Klaus Kinski and Omar Sharif as Thug leaders.
Help! (1965), a film which revolves around The Beatles' encounters with an Eastern Cult, is thought to parody the Thuggee.
"Sympathy For The Devil" (1968), a song by The Rolling Stones, features the lyrics: "And I laid traps for the troubadors / Who get killed before they reach Bombay" possibly referring to the murder of Tibetan musicians by Thuggee cultists.
Sunghursh (1968), an Indian Bollywood film, gives a fictionalized account of a thug who tries not to join his family business, which is Thuggee.
Thagini a Bengali film about a Lady Thug was released in 1974. The film was directed by Tarun Majumdar based on a short story of Subodh Ghosh.
 Indiana Jones and the Temple of Doom (1984) showcases the Thuggee cult with fictionalized religious ritual and the primary antagonist, Mola Ram, being a Thuggee High Priest of Kali.
The Black Company (1984-), a dark fantasy series by Glen Cook, features a cult called the Deceivers, largely based on the Thuggee, which plays a major role in the later novels.
The fictional DC Comics villain Ravan (starting 1987), a member of the Suicide Squad, is a modern-day member of the Thuggee cult.
The Deceivers (1988) is an adventure film about the murderous Thugs of India which is based on the 1952 John Masters novel with the same name. Pierce Brosnan plays William Savage, a tax-collector for a British-Indian company who goes under cover in 1825 to investigate a Thuggee sect.
Ameer Ali thug na peela rumal ni gaanth, a novel in three parts by the famous Gujarati thriller writer Harkisan Mehta, is a fictionalized account of the thug Amir Ali, with references to the infamous Pindari chief Chitu Pindari.
Theeran Adhigaaram Ondru (2017; Tamil) an honest police officer finds himself transferred again and again due to his sincerity. After his latest transfer, he comes across a file that involves a gang of ruthless thieves who loot and kill along the highway. A group of 13 people whose roots go back to these Thuggee tribes whose members camouflaged themselves as logistics and goods delivery vendors and plundered random cities and brutally murdered families, including women and children. Tamil Nadu police took this matter seriously when a member of the legislative assembly was victimized. This cult was brought down after a country-wide operation was conducted with limited resources for over 18 months.
Thugs of Hindostan (2018) is a Bollywood action-adventure film about a band of Thugs which resists the British East India Company's rule in India. The film stars Amitabh Bachchan, Aamir Khan, Katrina Kaif, Fatima Sana Shaikh and Lloyd Owen.
 The Strangler Vine (2014) by MJ Carter, a novel set in Calcutta in 1837, sees two representatives of the East India Company search for a missing author deep within the territory of the murderous Kali-worshipping Thugs.  
 Firingi Thagi (2015), a Bengali novel by Himadri Kishor Dashgupta, is a fictionalized rendering of Sir William Henry Sleeman's operations against the Thugs.
Ebong Inquistion, a Bengali novel series by Avik Sarkar, also features events in which the Thuggees are the key participants, with references to Sleeman, Feringhea, Khuda Baksh.
 The strategy game Age of Empires III: The Asian Dynasties features Thuggees and dacoits, both of whom are available to players as hired mercenaries, though they are somewhat inaccurately depicted as using pistols and musket.
 Thugs of Ramaghada (2022), is a Kannada movie, which is based on band of Thugs who try to rob the Rich Gangsters, the movie is directed by Karthik Maralabhavi starring Ashwin Hassan, Chandan Raj and Mahalakshmi

See also

 Thug Behram
 Pindari

References

Bibliography

Dash, Mike Thug: the true story of Indias murderous cult , 2005
Dutta, Krishna (2005) The sacred slaughterers. Book review of Thug: the true story of India's murderous cult by Mike Dash. In The Independent (Published: 8 July 2005) text
 Guidolin, Monica "Gli strangolatori di Kali. Il culto thag tra immaginario e realtà storica", Aurelia Edizioni, 2012, .
 Paton, James 'Collections on Thuggee and Dacoitee', British Library, Add MS 41300
Woerkens, Martine van  The Strangled Traveler: Colonial Imaginings and the Thugs of India (2002),
 Wagner, Kim, Stranglers and Bandits: A Historical Anthology of Thuggee (2009), Oxford University Press

External links

 ''Acting in the "Theatre of Anarchy": 'The Anti-Thug Campaign' and Elaborations of Colonial Rule in Early-Nineteenth Century India by Tom Lloyd (2006) in PDF file format 
 Parama Roy: Discovering India, Imagining Thuggee. In: idem, Indian Traffic. Identities in Question in Colonial and Postcolonial India. University of California Press 1998. (in html format) 
 Confessions of India's real-life Thugs
 

British India
Bandits
Outlaws
Illegal occupations
Indian robbers
Gangs in India
Indian slang
Secret societies in India
Secret societies related to organized crime